A referendum on granting greater autonomy to the departments of Bolivia was held on 2 July 2006, alongside elections for a Constitutional Assembly. Whilst it was approved in four of the nine departments, the proposal was rejected by 58% of voters nationally.

Results
The question asked was:

By Department

References

2006 in Bolivia
Referendums in Bolivia
2006 referendums
Autonomy referendums